Strojimir was the co-ruler of the Serbian Principality alongside his two brothers Mutimir and Gojnik, from ca 851 to his and Gojnik's deposition in the 880s after an unsuccessful coup against the eldest Prince Mutimir (r. 851-891).

He was a younger son of Vlastimir, who ruled in  836–851. Strojimir, together with his brothers Gojnik and Mutimir, defeated the Bulgarian Army sent by Boris I, led by his son Vladimir, who, together with 12 boyars was captured by the Serb Army. Peace was subsequently agreed and the two sons of Mutimir; Pribislav and Stefan Mutimirović escorted prisoners towards the border at Rasa. There Boris gave them rich gifts and was given 2 slaves, 2 falcons, two dogs, and 80 furs by Mutimir.

After power struggle between the younger brothers and Mutimir, he and Gojnik was captured and sent as prisoners to Bulgarian Khan Boris I in 855–856, as a token of peace-agreement, they both lost their titles as Princes of Serbia and were held at Pliska, the Bulgarian capital. Strojimir was treated well by the Bulgarians, Khan Boris himself chose the wife of Klonimir, the son of Strojimir.

The Seal of Strojimir
On July 11, 2006, the Serbian government bought a Byzantine-styled seal in solid gold weighing 15,64 g, most likely belonging to Strojimir (Klonimir's father), at an auction in Munich. It was presumably crafted outside Byzantium, and has a Greek inscription (KE BOIΘ CTPOHMIP, "God Help Strojimir") and a patriarchal cross in the centre. It most likely dates to the second half of the 9th century, between 855/56 and 896, when Klonimir tried to take the Serbian throne.

References

Sources

External links
 Steven Runciman, A History of the First Bulgarian Empire, London 1930.
 

9th-century Serbian royalty
Vlastimirović dynasty
Serbian exiles
People of the Bulgarian–Serbian Wars
Medieval Serbian princes
9th-century births
9th-century deaths
Medieval Serbian military leaders
Slavic warriors